Bruce W. Piasecki is an American author, academic, and environmentalist. He is the founder and president of AHC Group.

Early life and career 
Piasecki is a graduate of Cornell University, from where he received a doctorate degree, under the guidance of the literary historian M. H. Abrams.

After graduation, he started his academic career and became an associate professor at Rensselaer Polytechnic Institute and directed an environmental management program. He has also taught at Clarkson University and Cornell University. At Clarkson he taught courses such as Great Books in Western Civilization. He is particularly interested in Benjamin Franklin and has taught his biography for ten years. 

In 1981, Piasecki established AHC Group to help businesses, particularly Fortune 500 firms, in realizing their full potential in terms of environmental strategy and public policy.

In the 1990s, Piasecki served on a White House council formed by then-Vice President Al Gore.

In 1995, his book Corporate Environmental Strategy: The Avalanche of Change since Bhopal was reviewed by Booklist.

In March 2012 the first hardcover edition of Piasecki's book, Doing More with Less: The New Way to Wealth (Wiley), reached the #5 spot in the New York Times bestsellers list for nonfiction. VoiceAmerica interviewer David Gibbons called it "a fine book that weaves its way through the definitions of frugality and historical context as framed by the lives of Benjamin Franklin among others." His another book, New World Companies was reviewed by Kirkus and called it "Optimistic and full of good intentions".

American writer and academic Jay Parini wrote the Foreword to Piasecki's 2015 memoir, Missing Persons.

In 2021, he and his wife, Andrea Masters, launched the $5,000 Creative Force Fund Award for Social Impact Journalists. The award is given to young journalists covering business and society who are under the age of 35.

In March 2022, his new book, A New Way to Wealth: The Power of Doing More with Less, was published. The book has been reviewed by Kirkus Reviews.

Business and Society is a podcast series that Mia Funk and Bruce Piasecki developed together. They appear in her Creative Process series and One Planet Podcast series.

Bibliography 
 1987: America's Future in Toxic Waste Management: Lessons from Europe 
 1990: In Search of Environmental Excellence: Moving Beyond Blame
 1995: The Avalanche of Change Since Bhopal
 2007: World Inc
 2009: The Surprising Solution: Creating Possibility in a Swift and Severe World
 2015: Missing Persons: A Life of Unexpected Influences
 2016: New World Companies: The Future of Capitalism
 2016: Doing More With Less: The New Way To Wealth
 2016: Doing More With Teams: The New Way To Winning
 2021: Giants of Social Investing: John Streur and Jack Robinson
 2022: A New Way to Wealth: The Power of Doing More with Less

References

External link 
 Kirkus Book Review of New World Companies
 San Francisco Book Review of Missing Persons
 Doing More With Less: Piasecki's author website
 AHC Group: Piasecki's business consulting website

Cornell University alumni
Rensselaer Polytechnic Institute faculty
Clarkson University faculty
Cornell University faculty
American environmentalists